Soncy was an unincorporated community in Potter County, located in the U.S. state of Texas. It is now largely within the city limits of Amarillo, Texas. Soncy joins St. Francis Blvd which runs east to west in the north section of town with Hollywood Road routing west to east in the south section of town.

Soncy is a main thoroughfare in the west and intersects the belt road in Amarillo. The town is geographically located between Interstate 40 and the former U.S. Route 66 in the Texas Panhandle.

In the early 1930s, the United States Bureau of Mines and United States Department of War constructed an industrial gas extraction plant known as the Amarillo Helium Plant within the vicinity of Soncy, Texas.

References

External links
 

Unincorporated communities in Potter County, Texas
Unincorporated communities in Texas